Abdelwahab Meddeb (1946 – 5 November 2014) was a French-language writer and cultural critic, and a professor of comparative literature at the University of Paris X-Nanterre.

Biography and career
Meddeb was born in Tunis, French Tunisia, in 1946, into a learned and patrician milieu. His family's origins stretch from Tripoli and Yemen on his mother's side, to Spain and Morocco on his father's side. Raised in a traditionally observant Maghrebi Muslim family, Meddeb began learning the Qur'an at the age of four from his father, Sheik Mustapha Meddeb, a scholar of Islamic law at the Zitouna, the great mosque and university of Tunis. At the age of six he began his bilingual education at the Franco-Arabic school that was part of the famous Collège Sadiki. Thus began an intellectual trajectory nourished, in adolescence, by the classics of both Arabic and French and European literatures.

In 1967, Meddeb moved to Paris to continue his university studies at the Sorbonne in art history. In 1970-72, he collaborated on the dictionary Petit Robert: Des Noms Propres, working on entries concerning Islam and art history. From 1974-1987 he was a literary consultant at Sindbad publications, helping to introduce a French reading public to the classics of Arabic and Persian literatures as well as the great Sufi writers. A visiting Professor at Yale University and the University of Geneva, Meddeb has been teaching comparative literature since 1995 at the University of Paris X-Nanterre. Between 1992 and 1994 he was co-editor of the journal Intersignes, and in 1995 he started the journal Dédale. His first novel, Talismano, was published in Paris in 1979 and quickly became a founding text of avant-garde postcolonial fiction in French. At the time, he was "considered in France as one of the best young writers from North Africa".

After 9/11 Meddeb's work, informed by his self-described "double genealogy", both Western and Islamic, French and Arabic, included an urgent political dimension. An outspoken critic of Islamic fundamentalism, he lamented the rise of Islamic fascism, which he noted was both exploitative of traditional Islamic values and given to the glorification of totalitarian dictators that sought "to colonize every last corner of private life...and that dream of exterminating whole sectors of the population" (as opposed to authoritarian dictators whose main goal is to preserve their own power.) Meddeb, then, was a staunch proponent of secularism ("la laïcité") in the French Enlightenment tradition, as the necessary guarantor of democracy that would reconcile Islam with modernity. His vigilant point of view derived from what he called the "in-between" space ("l’entre deux") that he occupied as a North African writer based in France, and from the responsibility of being a public intellectual. His erudite historical and cultural analyses of world events led to many publications, interviews and radio commentaries. His carefully researched and well-argued 2002 study, La Maladie de l’Islam (translated and published in English as The Malady of Islam) traces the historical and cultural riches of medieval Islamic civilization and its subsequent decline.  The resulting posture, "inconsolable in its destitution", writes Meddeb, gave root to modern Islamic fundamentalism, a fact embodied by the modern Arab states' attachment to the archaic, Manichaean laws of "official Islam."  The book also explores the tragic consequences of the West's exclusion of Islam.

From editorials in the French newspaper Le Monde on the Israeli invasion of Gaza (i.e., 13 Jan. '09), to Obama's "Cairo Speech" (4 June 2009), to his two weekly radio programs, "Cultures d’islam" at Radio France Culture and "Point de Vue" at Médi 1 (broadcast from Tangiers, Morocco), to his television appearances and his online interviews, Meddeb uses the media as a forum for exploration and debate. After his death, the radio programme "Cultures d’islam" is led by Abdennour Bidar. His work juxtaposes writers and scholars from East and West, engaging subjects that are historical, cultural, religious, political, and thereby challenging the stereotypes that Muslims and Europeans hold about each other. A voice of tolerant Islam, Meddeb is no stranger to controversy from militant Muslim quarters and some left-wing journalists, who accuse him of complacency towards the Ben Ali regime.

Overview of the literary work
 
From his earliest essays, novels, poems and editorial work in the mid-1970s onward, Meddeb's writing has always been multiple and diverse, forming an ongoing literary project that mixes and transcends genres. His texts are those of a polymath.

The movement and rhythms of his French sentences are commensurate with the meditations of a narrator who is a flâneur, a walker in the city, and a poet without borders.  Associative imagery allows the writing to nomadize across space and time, to dialogue with writers such as Dante and Ibn Arabi, the Sufi poets and Stéphane Mallarmé, Spinoza, Aristotle and Averroes (Ibn Rushd), along with the poets of classical China and Japan. Formally, Meddeb practices what he calls an "esthetics of the heterogeneous,” playing with different literary forms from many traditions, including the European modernist novel, pre-Islamic Arabic poetry, the medieval mystical poets of Islam, Japanese Haiku, and so on. Although he writes only in French, his work as a translator of medieval Arabophone poets, as well as his conscious literary ambition to "liberate the Islamic referent from its strict context so that it circulates in the contemporary French text" marks his writing with enigmatic traces of 'otherness".  His privileging of these Arabic and Persian literary precursors explores archaic cultural resources in postmodern forms, emphasizing the esthetic, spiritual and ethical aspects of Islam.  His work, translated into over a dozen languages, opens onto and enriches the dialogue with contemporary world literature.

Literary prizes
2002 – Prix François Mauriac, La Maladie de l’Islam2002 – Prix Max Jacob, Matière des oiseaux2007 – Prix international de littérature francophone Benjamin Fondane – Contre-prêches

Bibliography 
Available in French
Talismano 1979; 1987
Phantasia 1986
Tombeau d’Ibn 'Arabi 1987
Les Dits de Bistami 1989
La Gazelle et l’enfant 1992
Récit de l’exil occidental par Sohrawardi 1993
Les 99 Stations de Yale 1995
Ré Soupault. La Tunisie 1936-1940. 1996
Blanches traverses du passé 1997
En Tunisie avec Jellal Gasteli et Albert Memmi 1998
Aya dans les villes 1999
Matière des oiseaux 2002
La Maladie de l’Islam 2002
Face à l’Islam entretiens avec Philippe Petit 2003
Saigyô. Vers le vide avec Hiromi Tsukui 2004
L’Exil occidental 2005
Tchétchénie surexposée avec Maryvonne Arnaud 2005
Contre-prêches. Chroniques 2006
La Conférence de Ratisbonne, enjeux et controverse avec Jean Bollack et Christian Jambet 2007
Sortir de la malédiction. L’Islam entre civilisation et barbarie 2008
Pari de civilisation 2009 
Printemps de Tunis 2011 
Histoire des Relations entre Juifs et Musulmans des Origines à nos Jours, co-dirigé avec Benjamin Stora 2013

Books in English translation
The Malady of Islam. New York: Basic Books, 2003. Trans. Pierre Joris and Ann Reid  
Islam and Its Discontents. London: Heinemann, 2004.(British Edition)
Tombeau of Ibn' Arabi and White Traverses. With an afterword by Jean-Luc Nancy. Trans. Charlotte Mandell. New York: Fordham University Press. 2009.
Talismano. Translated and Introduction by Jane Kuntz. Dalkey Archive Press, Champaign, Ill: University of Illinois Press, 2011
Islam and Challenge of civilisation.Translated by Jane Kuntz, New York, Fordham University Press, 2013 
 A History of Jewish-Muslim Relations - From the Origins to the Present Day, co-directed with Benjamin Stora, New Jersey, Princeton University Press, 2013

Poems and interviews
(in periodicals, online, and in collections)
Abdelwahab Meddeb. "Islam and its Discontents: An Interview with Frank Berberich ,” in October 99, Winter 2002, pp. 3–20, Cambridge: MIT, trans. Pierre Joris.
(All translations below by Charlotte Mandell)
Abdelwahab Meddeb, "The Stranger Across", in Cerise Press, Summer 2009, online:
Abdelwahab Meddeb, "At the Tomb of Hafiz," in The Modern Review, Winter 2006, Vol. II, Issue 2, pp. 15–16.
Maram al-Massri, "Every night the birds sleep in their solitude" and Abdelwahab Meddeb, "Wandering" in The Cúirt Annual 2006, published by the Cúirt International Festival of Literature, Galway, April 2006, pp. 78–80.
Abdelwahab Meddeb, "California apple with no apple taste" (poem), in Two Lines: A Journal of Translation, XIII, published by Center for the Art of Translation, 2006, pp. 188–191.73-80.
Abdelwahab Meddeb, selections from "Tomb of Ibn Arabi," in The Yale Anthology of Twentieth-Century Poetry, ed. Mary Ann Caws, New Haven & London: Yale University Press, 2004, pp. 418–419.

Filmography
 "Miroirs de Tunis", Raul Ruiz, dir. 1993.

See also 
 Islamic Modernism

References
Some of the content of this article comes from the equivalent French-language Wikipedia article:
Andrea Flores Khalil, The Arab Avant-Garde: Experiments in North African Art and Literature. Westport, Ct.: Praeger, 2003.
Naceureddine Elafrite, "Tunisie. Abdelwahab Meddeb: 'L'Islamisme est une interprétation pauvre, bête et détestable de l'Islam'", Le Courrier de l'Atlas, 11 December 2012. 
Ronnie Scharfman, Nomadism and Transcultural Writing in the Works of Abdelwahab Meddeb, in L’Esprit créateur, Lexington, Ky.: Vol. XLI, No. 3, Fall 2001, pp. 105–113.

Notes

External links

 Signandsight.com Abdelwahab Meddeb: The Pornography of Horror
 Michael Mönninger, Abdelwahab Meddeb: Islam's Heritage of Violence
 The English Pen Online World Atlas - Abdelwahab Meddeb
 Sweeping Our Own Backyard: UNESCO
 Abdelwahab Meddeb—Islam and the Enlightenment
 The international artist database

1946 births
2014 deaths
Writers from Tunis
Tunisian emigrants to France
French people of Libyan descent
French people of Moroccan descent
French people of Yemeni descent
20th-century Tunisian poets
Tunisian people of Libyan descent
Tunisian people of Moroccan descent
Tunisian people of Yemeni descent
Critics of Islamism
Tunisian novelists
Alumni of Sadiki College
French male poets
French male novelists
20th-century French poets
20th-century French novelists
20th-century French translators
20th-century French male writers
French male non-fiction writers
21st-century Tunisian poets